Lucien Jerphagnon (7 September 1921 – 16 September 2011) was a French scholar, historian and philosopher specialized in Greek and Roman philosophy.

Biography 
Lucien Jerphagnon is the son of Émile Jerphagnon, a regional engineer of French Ministry of National Education and Madame Jerphagnon, born Jeanne Lallemand.

He became doctor in philosophy under professor Vladimir Jankélévitch (1965) and became a lecturer at the University of Franche-Comté of Besançon (1966–1970) and professor at the Caen University (1970–1984).

Bibliography 

 1955: Le mal et l'existence : réflexions pour servir à la pratique journalière, Les Éditions Ouvrières
 1956: Pascal et la souffrance, Les Éditions Ouvrières
 1957: Prières pour les jours intenables, Les Éditions Ouvrières
 1958: Servitude de la liberté ? : liberté – providence – prédestination, A. Fayard
 1960: Pascal, Éditions Ouvrières
 1961: Qu'est-ce-que la personne humaine ? : Enracinement, nature, destin, Privat
 1962: Le caractère de Pascal, PUF
 1966: De la banalité. Essai sur l'ipséité et sa durée vécue, Vrin, coll. "Problèmes et controverses"
 1969: Introduction à la philosophie générale, SEDES-CDU
 1973, 1980, 1989: Dictionnaires des grandes philosophies, sous la dir. de L. Jerphagnon, Privat
 1980, 1982, 1987: Histoire des grandes philosophies, sous la dir. de L. Jerphagnon, Privat
 1980: Vivre et philosopher sous les Césars, Privat 
 1983: Vivre et philosopher sous l'Empire chrétien, Privat
 1987, 1994, 2002: Histoire de la Rome Antique, Tallandier
 1989: Du banal au merveilleux. Mélanges offerts,  Les Cahiers de Fontenay, 55-57
 1989, 1993: Histoire de la Pensée, Tome 1 "Antiquité et Moyen Âge", Tallandier
 1991: Les Divins Césars. Étude sur le pouvoir dans la Rome impériale, Tallandier, coll. "Approches"
 1998–2002: Œuvres de saint Augustin, Gallimard, "Bibliothèque de la Pléiade", 3 vol.
 2002: Saint Augustin. Le pédagogue de Dieu, Gallimard, coll. "Découvertes Gallimard" (n° 416)
 2002, 2006: Les Dieux ne sont jamais loin, Desclée de Brouwer
 2004: Le petit livre des citations latines, Tallandier
 2006: Augustin et la sagesse, Desclée de Brouwer
 2007: Au bonheur des sages, Hachette Littératures
 2007: La Louve et l'Agneau, Desclée de Brouwer
 2008: Entrevoir et Vouloir : Vladimir Jankélévitch, La Transparence
 2008: Julien, dit l'Apostat, préface de Paul Veyne, Tallandier
 2009: La tentation du christianisme avec Luc Ferry, Grasset
 2010: La… sottise ? (Vingt-huit siècles qu'on en parle), Albin Michel
 2011: De l'amour, de la mort, de Dieu et autres bagatelles, entretiens avec Christiane Rancé, Albin Michel
 201 : Les armes et les mots, préface de Jean d'Ormesson, coll."Bouquins", Robert Laffont
 2012: Connais-toi toi-même… Et fais ce que tu aimes, préface de Stéphane Barsacq, Albin Michel
 2013: L’Homme qui riait avec les dieux, Albin Michel
 2014: Les Miscellanées d'un Gallo-Romain, Perrin
 2014: À l'école des Anciens, Perrin
 2014: Mes cours d'antan, Belles Lettres

References 

Academic staff of the University of Caen Normandy
20th-century French philosophers
21st-century French philosophers
20th-century French essayists
21st-century French essayists
20th-century French writers
21st-century French writers
Intellectual historians
French historians of philosophy
French scholars of ancient Greek philosophy
French scholars of Roman history
Writers from Nancy, France
1921 births
2011 deaths
Academic staff of the University of Franche-Comté